Antony William de Ávila Charris (born December 21, 1962) is a Colombian former soccer striker nicknamed El Pitufo ("The Smurf"), who last played for América de Cali.

Club career 
De Ávila began his career with América de Cali in his native Colombia in 1982. He spent the majority of his career with the club, winning seven league titles with América, including five in a row from 1982 to 1986. His 25 goals for América in the 1990 season led all scorers in the Colombian top flight. His time with América also led him to be runner-up in the Copa Libertadores on three occasions in 1985, 1986, and 1996.

De Ávila also spent time abroad, playing for Unión de Santa Fe of Argentina in between spells with América, the MetroStars of Major League Soccer, and Barcelona SC of Ecuador.

De Ávila's MLS career spanned a season and a half, as he joined the Metros midway through the 1996 season as a replacement for colossal disappointment Rubén Darío Hernández. With the club playing on AstroTurf for parts of the season, El Pitufo was surprisingly adept at what was called "ping-pong soccer". He scored 15 goals and added 11 assists in his time in the league, plus another two goals and an assist in the playoffs.

In 1997, De Ávila left the MLS and moved to Ecuador to play for Barcelona de Ecuador. With the club, he reached another Copa Libertadores final but again failed to win, becoming the only player to have lost five Libertadores finals.

De Ávila retired in 1999, but returned to competitive football at the age of 46 with América de Cali, eventually finishing his career with a club record 208 goals.

His 29 goals in the Copa Libertadores ranked him sixth highest scorer in the history of the tournament.

International career 
De Ávila made his senior debut on 26 July 1983. He went on to score 13 goals in 54 appearances for the Colombia national team between 1983 and 1998. He represented his country at two World Cups, in 1994 and 1998 respectively.

Personal life 
Nicknamed El Pitufo ("The Smurf") or El Pipa, he was known as much for his short height of 1.57m (5 ft 3 in) as for his goal-scoring prowess. After retiring, de Ávila bought a farm and he was still living there as of 2020.

Career statistics
Scores and results list goal tally first.

Scores and results list Colombia's goal tally first, score column indicates score after each de Ávila goal.

Honours 
América de Cali
Categoría Primera A: 1982, 1983, 1984, 1985, 1986, 1990, 1992
Copa Libertadores runner-up: 1985, 1986, 1996

Barcelona de Ecuador
Ecuadorian Serie A: 1997
Copa Libertadores runner-up: 1998

Individual
Categoría Primera A top scorer: 1990
Copa Libertadores top scorer: 1996

References

External links

1962 births
Living people
Colombian footballers
Colombian expatriate footballers
Colombia international footballers
People from Santa Marta
1994 FIFA World Cup players
1998 FIFA World Cup players
1987 Copa América players
1989 Copa América players
1991 Copa América players
América de Cali footballers
New York Red Bulls players
Barcelona S.C. footballers
Unión de Santa Fe footballers
Categoría Primera A players
Argentine Primera División players
Major League Soccer players
Ecuadorian Serie A players
Expatriate footballers in Argentina
Expatriate footballers in Ecuador
Expatriate soccer players in the United States
Association football forwards
Sportspeople from Magdalena Department